Aurelia Reinhardt Alumnae Memorial House is a building on the campus of Mills College in Oakland, California. It was designed by architect Clarence W. Mayhew, and named after college president Aurelia Henry Reinhardt. It was completed in 1949. Mayhew's design gave it "gabled roofs, wide eaves, and easy access to gardens" considered "fundamentally Californian design".

References

Sources

External links
 (Mills College)

Houses in Oakland, California
Mills College
1949 establishments in California